Hypsilurus modestus, the modest forest dragon, is a species of agama found in Indonesia and Papua New Guinea.

References

Hypsilurus
Taxa named by Adolf Bernhard Meyer
Reptiles described in 1874
Agamid lizards of New Guinea